The DBAG Class 225 are a set of related 4 axle diesel hydraulic locomotives from the DB V 160 family.  The series does not represent a new build, but a reclassification and/or rebuilding of 1960s and 1970s locomotives of Class 215 and 218 units.

The class were transferred to DB Cargo for freight only operations. The individual details of the members are as the locomotive classes they were derived from, excluding any modifications undertaking for the conversion to non-passenger work.

Background, history and design modifications

After passenger work for many of the DB Class 215 disappeared, DB Regio transferred 68 locomotives to DB Cargo (later Railion) for freight work.

From 2001 onwards the units underwent conversion to Class 225. Later, between 2003 and 2005, another six engines, prototypes of the DB Class 218, were transferred and converted to Class 225.8.

The steam heating was removed since it was no longer needed; instead, a heater for pre-heating the engine machinery was installed. A large part of them went into service still unmodified, the removal of the steam boiler taking place later concurrently with scheduled overhauls.

All of the class have multiple working control, allowing consists to be formed with both DB Class 217 and DB Class 218 (for example, a pair consting of a 217 and 225 class were often in use around Mühldorf).

There are differences between the individual class members; locomotives 225 001-004 and 225 802-811 lack a hydrodynamic brake. The locomotives 215 030 to 215 032 also were transferred to this class. The auxiliary generator in these special examples was not removed.

The top speed for this class is limited to 130 km/h. Their central depot is in Leipzig, locomotives in use work from the depots of Giessen, Gremberg, Kornwestheim, Mainz-Bischofsheim, Mühldorf and Oberhausen-Osterfeld.

As of June 2008 the locomotives have been partially phased out, but there are still about 50 machines operating in active service. A complete phasing out of the locomotives is not currently (2015) planned since the remainders are still in use.

References

External links

Diesel locomotives of Germany
225
B-B locomotives
Railway locomotives introduced in 2001
Diesel-hydraulic locomotives of Germany